Berzé-le-Châtel is a commune in the Saône-et-Loire department in the region of Bourgogne-Franche-Comté in eastern France.

The trouvère Hugues IV de Berzé was the ruler of Berzé-le-Châtel in the early 13th century.

It is said that the castle's basement extends 1000 feet into the ground.

Population

See also
Communes of the Saône-et-Loire department

References

External links

Berzé-le-Châtel  Official site of the castle

Communes of Saône-et-Loire